Anri Abriyevich Bestayev (born 22 April 1964) is a retired Russian football player.

Honours
 Russian Top League runner-up: 1992.

External links
 

1964 births
Sportspeople from Vladikavkaz
Living people
Soviet footballers
FC Spartak Vladikavkaz players
Russian footballers
Russian Premier League players
Russian expatriate footballers
Expatriate footballers in Georgia (country)
FC Kolkheti-1913 Poti players
FC Dinamo Sukhumi players
Association football forwards